Burrow Beach, also known as the Hole in the Wall locally, is a beach in Sutton, in Fingal, County Dublin, Ireland. It neighbours Claremont Beach by Howth village, and, across the water (the exit of the inlet of Baldoyle Bay), Portmarnock Strand. It is served by a lifeguard during the summer months and is a green flag beach.

Location and geography
The beach is located on the north side of the Tombolo of Sutton which connects Howth Head to the mainland. It is a sandy beach and contains a large area of sand dunes. It is 1.2 km long.

The beach is served by the DART, as Sutton Station is a walkable distance away. Its main entrance is located on the Burrow road. It is also served by Dublin Bus route 31 and its variants from Sutton Cross, as well as route 102 which terminates at the DART station.

See also
Sutton, Dublin
Howth

References

Beaches of the Republic of Ireland
Sutton, Dublin